Braian Ezequiel Romero (born 15 June 1991) is an Argentine professional footballer who plays as a centre-forward for Tijuana, on loan from Internacional.

Career

Acassuso
Romero's first professional club were Acassuso of Primera B Metropolitana, making thirty-two appearances in his debut season while scoring four times; including his first against Colegiales. In total, he appeared in seventy-eight league fixtures for Acassuso between 2011–12 and 2014.

Colón (loan)
In January 2015, Romero joined Argentine Primera División team Colón on loan. He scored in his fourth match, earning Colón a 1–1 draw against Rosario Central. Four goals in fifteen fixtures followed.

Argentinos Juniors
On 10 January 2016, Romero completed a permanent transfer to fellow Primera División side Argentinos Juniors.

Argentinos were relegated to Primera B Nacional in his first season, he subsequently scored fifteen goals in forty-two matches in Primera B Nacional to help the club regain top-flight football for 2017–18.

Independiente
On 30 December 2017, Romero completed a transfer to Independiente. His first appearance for Independiente came versus Estudiantes on 29 January 2018, with his first goal arriving on 5 March against San Martín.

Athletico Paranaense (loan)
February 2019 saw Romero move to Brazil's Athletico Paranaense on loan. After a debut in a loss versus Fortaleza, he netted for the first time in Série A on 20 July in a four-goal win away to CSA.

Romero won the 2019 J.League Cup / Copa Sudamericana Championship and 2019 Copa do Brasil with Athletico Paranaense, notably scoring in the former during a 4–0 victory over Shonan Bellmare in Hiratsuka on 7 August. In total, he scored three goals in twenty-four matches. Back in Argentina, he appeared in six matches and scored one goal, versus Rosario Central, in 2019–20. September 2020 saw Romero join Defensa y Justicia on loan. He scored five in his first seven; netting in the Copa Libertadores over Delfín, Olimpia and Santos and in the Copa Sudamericana against Sportivo Luqueño (2).

Defensa y Justicia (loan)
On 16 January 2021, Romero scored a hat-trick as Defensa y Justicia defeated Coquimbo Unido in the Copa Sudamericana semi-finals; taking his tally in the competition for the club to nine goals in eight games. He then netted in the final against Lanús on 23 January, with Defensa defeating their domestic rivals to win their first Sudamericana title; the centre-forward finished as the top scorer with ten goals.

River Plate
On 7 July 2021 River Plate signed Romero on a three-and-a-half year contract to replace the recently transferred Rafael Santos Borré.

Career statistics

Honours
Argentinos Juniors
Primera B Nacional: 2016–17

Athletico Paranaense
J.League Cup / Copa Sudamericana Championship: 2019
Copa do Brasil: 2019

Defensa y Justicia
Copa Sudamericana: 2020
Recopa Sudamericana: 2021

River Plate
Argentine Primera División: 2021

References

External links

1991 births
Living people
People from San Isidro, Buenos Aires
Argentine footballers
Association football forwards
Argentine expatriate footballers
Expatriate footballers in Brazil
Argentine expatriate sportspeople in Brazil
Primera B Metropolitana players
Argentine Primera División players
Primera Nacional players
Campeonato Brasileiro Série A players
Club Atlético Acassuso footballers
Club Atlético Colón footballers
Argentinos Juniors footballers
Club Atlético Independiente footballers
Club Athletico Paranaense players
Defensa y Justicia footballers
Club Atlético River Plate footballers
Sport Club Internacional players
Sportspeople from Buenos Aires Province